Muhammad Adib bin Abdul Ra'op (born 25 October 1999) is a Malaysian professional footballer who plays as a left-back for Malaysia Super League club Penang.

References

External links 
 

Living people
1999 births
People from Perak
Malaysian footballers
Association football defenders
Perak F.C. players
Penang F.C. players
Malaysia Super League players